Highway 910 is a provincial highway in the north-west region of the Canadian province of Saskatchewan. It runs from Highway 165 until it transitions into the access road at Besnard Lake for Besnard Lake Recreation Site.

See also 
Roads in Saskatchewan
Transportation in Saskatchewan

References 

910